Light Soup is a local indigenous soup of the Akan people  of Ghana. Originally formulated as a 'Tomatoes-Base Sea Fish Light Soup' called 'Nkra Nkra(or Aklor)' for fishermen at the coast of Accra, but over the course of time it evolved into a soup prepared with both 'fish and goat-meat', or 'fish and lamb-meat', or 'fish and beef', or 'exclusively the meat of the livestock of choice', and of which the GaDangmes(or Gas) call 'Toolo Wonu', but their neighbouring 'Akans' call 'Aponkye Nkrakra'. The delicious local indigenous 'Light Soup' of the GaDangme(or Ga) people paved the way for the formulation of GaDangme(or Ga) MEALS such as: (1) 'Komi Ke Aklo(or Aklor), Garnished With Cooked Blended Okro', (2) 'Banku Ke Aklo(or Aklor), Garnished With Cooked Blended Okro', (3) 'Yele(Chops of Boiled-Yam) Ke Aklo(or Aklor)', (4) etc., and similar meals of the 'Toolo Wonu' version, and to name a few: (1) 'Yele(Chops of Boiled-Yam) Ke Toolo Wonu', (2) 'Atomo(Chops of Boiled-Potatoes) Ke Toolo Wonu', (3) etc.

Mode of serving 
It can be served with Fufu, Banku, kokonte, boiled rice or yam. Boiled okro can be added to it.

Ingredients 
The ingredients include tomatoes, tomato paste, chili peppers, onion, salt, ginger, garden eggs, and dry or salted fish and/or meat.

Method of preparation 
Lightsoup is prepared by steaming fish or meat with seasonings, onion, garlic and ginger in a saucepan. Tomato paste is then added. Chili peppers, garden eggs and tomatoes are boiled, blended and added to the saucepan. Water is added to bring the soup to its desired thickness. More onions and tomatoes are added, then blended, and the soup is left to simmer. It is then served with dishes like fufu, banku, or konkonte.

See also 

 Ghanaian cuisine
 List of soups

References

External links 

 Video: How to Prepare Lightsoup

Soups
Ghanaian cuisine
National dishes
Okra dishes
Spicy foods